Unsoul is a Brazilian supernatural drama web television series, written by Ana Paula Maia, and broadcast by Globoplay since October 21, 2020.

The series was shown at the Berlin International Film Festival, where it was acclaimed for its history and photography by viewers and various film experts.

The Brazilian production will be shown internationally through distribution by Sony Pictures Television in one of the partnerships with Grupo Globo.

Plot
The story begins with the disappearance of the young Halyna (Anna Melo) in 1988, in the fictional city of Brígida (Ukrainian: Бріжіда), founded by Ukrainian immigrants in the countryside of Southern Brazil.

At the time of the disappearance, the town celebrated Ivana-Kupala, a feast with pagan origins and linked to fertility rites that was incorporated later into the calendar of Orthodox Christians, and in fact is held at the turn of 6 to 7 July. The tragedy caused the feast to be banned from the city's calendar, and thirty years later, when tradition is resumed, mysterious events happen again.

Cast

Main 
 Cássia Kis as Haia Lachovicz
 Cláudia Abreu as Ignes Skavronski Burko
 Valentina Ghiorzi as young Ignes
 Maria Ribeiro as Giovana Skavronski
 Anna Melo as Halyna Lachovicz
 Bruce Gomlevsky as Ivan Burko
 Giovanni Gallo as young Ivan
 Ismael Caneppele as Bóris Burko
 Lucas Soares as young Bóris
 Camila Botelho as Melissa Skavronski
 Giovanni de Lorenzi as Maksym Burko
 Nathália Falcão as Iryna Burko
 Isabel Teixeira as Anele
 Giovanna Figueiredo as young Anele
 Gabriel Muglia as Pavlo Lachovicz
 João Pedro Azevedo as Anatoli Skavronski Burko
 Juliah Mello as Emily Skavronski

Recurring 
 Luciano Chirolli as Viktor Skavronski
 Henrique Taxman as Olek Skavronski
 Adriana Rabello as Catarina Skavronski
 Susanna Kruger as Mira Skavronski
 Sabrina Greve as Elena Kohut
 Nathália Garcia as Oksana
 Lucas Lentini as Iuri
 Bela Leindecker as Natasha Burloski
 Evandro Soldatelli as Vladimir

Guest 
 Nikolas Antunes as Roman Skavronski
 Eduardo Borelli as young Roman
 André Frateschi as Aleksey Skavronski
 Nicolas Vargas as young Aleksey
 Alexandra Richter as Sister Anninka
 Jonas Bloch as Father Andreiv Kozel
 Betina Viany as Sister Benedites Boiko
 Rafael Sieg as Dr. Igor Machula
 Hall Mendes as young Igor
 Felipe Kannenberg as Polaco

Episodes

Season 1 (2020)

Production 
During 30 days,  filming for Unsoul took place at the mountainous region of Rio Grande do Sul, with the use of more than 36 sets, 16 of them in an area of 300,000 square meters in the city of São Francisco de Paula.

References

External links
 

Brazilian drama television series
Brazilian supernatural television series
Portuguese-language television shows
Globoplay original programming